Vera Bitanji (born 21 April 1969) is an Albanian athlete and triple jumper. She represented Albania in the 1996 Summer Olympics competing in the women's triple jump.

References 

1969 births
Albanian female triple jumpers
Athletes (track and field) at the 1996 Summer Olympics
Living people
Olympic athletes of Albania
Place of birth missing (living people)